Konstantinos Daskalakis (born 6 December 1982) is a Greek former professional footballer who played as a midfielder.

References

1982 births
Living people
Greek footballers
Kalamata F.C. players
Panathinaikos F.C. players
Agios Nikolaos F.C. players
Marko F.C. players
Fostiras F.C. players
Proodeftiki F.C. players
Messiniakos F.C. players
Panachaiki F.C. players
Agios Dimitrios F.C. players
Panegialios F.C. players
Chalkida F.C. players
Acharnaikos F.C. players
Korinthos F.C. players
South Springvale SC players
Super League Greece players
Association football midfielders
Greek expatriate footballers
Expatriate soccer players in Australia
Greek expatriate sportspeople in Australia
Footballers from Kalamata